The 1983 Head Classic was a men's tennis tournament played on outdoor hard courts at the Topnotch Inn in Stowe, Vermont in the United States that was part of the 1983 Grand Prix circuit. It was the sixth edition of the tournament and was held from August 15 through August 21, 1983. Fourth-seeded John Fitzgerald won the singles title.

Finals

Singles
 John Fitzgerald defeated  Vijay Amritraj 3–6, 6–2, 7–5
 It was Fitzgerald's 2nd singles title of the year and the 4th of his career.

Doubles
 Kim Warwick /  Brad Drewett defeated  Fritz Buehning /  Tom Gullikson 4–6, 7–5, 6–2

References

Stowe Grand Prix
Stowe Grand Prix